Lamine Sakho (born 28 September 1977) is a Senegalese former professional footballer who played as a winger or striker.

Career

Early career
Sakho's previous clubs were Nîmes Olympique, RC Lens, Olympique Marseille and AS Saint-Étienne

Leeds United
Sakho also had a short loan spell with Leeds United in which he scored once in 17 appearances, in a 3–2 win at Middlesbrough in August 2003. At Leeds United Sakho had a hugely promising debut against Newcastle United where he played left wing and received man of the match, after that his form never came up to the same standard and after suffering a cruciate knee ligament injury his time at Leeds was effectively over.

He was known as a striker prior to joining Leeds, but he found himself mainly being played as a winger during his time at the Elland Road club, where he was competing with James Milner and Jermaine Pennant for places. That season Leeds were relegated from the Premier League. Sakho was regarded as one of the more successful loan players that season, after several players such as Roque Junior and Cyril Chapuis had torrid spells at Leeds.

Wrexham
Following spells in France and Cyprus, he scored his first goal for Wrexham in a 1–0 away win at Ebbsfleet United on 31 October 2009. Sakho received a straight red card for Wrexham in the game against Hayes & Yeading after headbutting a player. His contract was terminated by 'mutual consent' in March 2010 after failing to make an impact at the club.

Consolat
In January 2012, after almost two years without a club, Sakho signed for Championnat de France amateur club Consolat Marseille. He made his debut on 18 February 2012 in the 1–0 home win against Gap.

References

External links
 
 
 

1977 births
Living people
Footballers from Dakar
Association football forwards
Senegalese footballers
Senegal international footballers
2004 African Cup of Nations players
Nîmes Olympique players
RC Lens players
Olympique de Marseille players
Leeds United F.C. players
AS Saint-Étienne players
Montpellier HSC players
Alki Larnaca FC players
Wrexham A.F.C. players
Athlético Marseille players
Premier League players
Ligue 1 players
Cypriot First Division players
Senegalese expatriate footballers
Senegalese expatriate sportspeople in France
Expatriate footballers in France
Senegalese expatriate sportspeople in England
Expatriate footballers in England
Senegalese expatriate sportspeople in Cyprus
Expatriate footballers in Cyprus
Senegalese expatriate sportspeople in Wales
Expatriate footballers in Wales